Darko Tasevski (born 20 May 1984) is a Macedonian professional footballer who plays as a midfielder for Bulgarian First League club Slavia Sofia. He holds also Bulgarian citizenship.

Club career
Prior to joining Levski, in the summer of 2005 he played for FK Vardar and Ukrainian side FC Metalurh Zaporizhzhya.

Levski Sofia
Tasevski played in a derby match against Litex Lovech on 27 September 2008 and scored two goals. The final result was 2:0 with a home win for Levski Sofia.

On 17 May 2009, Tasevski scored a goal in the 44th second of the match against PFC Spartak Varna. The result of the match was 5:0 with a home win for Levski. He became a Champion of Bulgaria in 2009.

On 15 July 2009 he opened his goal account for the new season with a goal in the first official match for Levski during 2009/2010 season. The event took place in the 2nd Qualifying round of UEFA Champions League, where Levski beaten the team of UE Sant Julià. The result of the match was 4:0 with a home win for Levski.

On 25 October 2010, he was sent off in the 1:2 away loss against Litex Lovech. Tasevski re-signed his contract with PFC Levski Sofia on 11 January 2011. The new contract keeps him in the team until the summer of 2012.

Ironi Kiryat Shmona
He has been announced as a future signing for F.C. Ironi Kiryat Shmona in the 2012 summer transfer window.

Suphanburi
In June 2016 after 2 and half years with Bangkok Glass Tasevski joined Suphanburi, reuniting with former coach Ricardo Rodríguez. However, he left the club at the end of the season after his contract expired.

Slavia Sofia
In January 2019 Tasevski returned to Bulgaria, agreeing terms with Slavia Sofia.

Career Stats
.

International career
He made his senior debut for Macedonia in an October 2005 FIFA World Cup qualification match against the Netherlands and has earned a total of 45 caps, scoring 1 goal. His final international was an October 2013 World Cup qualification match against Wales.

International goals

Awards
 Thai FA Cup  2014
 Champion of Bulgaria 2009
 Bulgarian Supercup 2007, 2009
 Macedonian Cup 2003

References

External links
 
 
 Darko Tasevski at MacedonianFootball.com 
 

1984 births
Living people
Footballers from Skopje
Macedonian people of Bulgarian descent
Association football midfielders
Macedonian footballers
North Macedonia youth international footballers
North Macedonia under-21 international footballers
North Macedonia international footballers
FK Cementarnica 55 players
FK Vardar players
FC Metalurh Zaporizhzhia players
PFC Levski Sofia players
Hapoel Ironi Kiryat Shmona F.C. players
Darko Tasevski
Darko Tasevski
Darko Tasevski
PFC Slavia Sofia players
Macedonian First Football League players
Ukrainian Premier League players
First Professional Football League (Bulgaria) players
Israeli Premier League players
Darko Tasevski
Darko Tasevski
Macedonian expatriate footballers
Expatriate footballers in Ukraine
Expatriate footballers in Bulgaria
Expatriate footballers in Israel
Expatriate footballers in Thailand
Macedonian expatriate sportspeople in Ukraine
Macedonian expatriate sportspeople in Bulgaria
Macedonian expatriate sportspeople in Israel
Macedonian expatriate sportspeople in Thailand